Floyd County is a county in the U.S. state of Texas. As of the 2020 census, its population was 5,402. The seat of the county is Floydada. The county was created in 1876 and later organized in 1890. It is named for Dolphin Ward Floyd, who died on his 32nd birthday, March 6, 1836, defending the Alamo.

The Matador Ranch, based in Motley County,  once reached into Floyd County, as well.

Geography

Major highways
  U.S. Highway 62
  U.S. Highway 70
  State Highway 207

Adjacent counties
 Briscoe County (north)
 Motley County (east)
 Dickens County (southeast)
 Crosby County (south)
 Lubbock County (southwest)
 Hale County (west)
 Swisher County (northwest)

Demographics

Note: the US Census treats Hispanic/Latino as an ethnic category. This table excludes Latinos from the racial categories and assigns them to a separate category. Hispanics/Latinos can be of any race.

As of the census of 2010, the county had 6,446 people.

The 2000 census showed 2,730 households and 2,110 families residing in the county.  The population density was 8 people per square mile (3/km2).  The3,221 housing units averaged of 3 per square mile (1/km2).  The racial makeup of the county was 74.16% White, 3.38% African American, 0.76% Native American, 0.17% Asian, 0.05% Pacific Islander, 19.66% from other races, and 1.81% from two or more races.  About 45.93% of the population was Hispanic or Latino of any race.

Of the 2,730 households, 39.40% had children under the age of 18 living with them, 63.90% were married couples living together, 9.70% had a female householder with no husband present, and 22.70% were not families. Around 21.30% of all households were made up of individuals, and 12.30% had someone living alone who was 65 years of age or older.  The average household size was 2.79 and the average family size was 3.26.

In the county, the population was distributed as 31.40% under the age of 18, 7.40% from 18 to 24, 24.40% from 25 to 44, 20.70% from 45 to 64, and 16.20% who were 65 years of age or older.  The median age was 35 years. For every 100 females there were 93.80 males.  For every 100 females age 18 and over, there were 89.90 males.

The median income for a household in the county was $26,851, and for a family was $32,123. Males had a median income of $25,487 versus $18,929 for females. The per capita income for the county was $14,206.  About 19.50% of families and 21.50% of the population were below the poverty line, including 28.60% of those under age 18 and 16.50% of those age 65 or over.

Wind energy development
Floyd County is ideal for wind development. It is located in what many call the wind corridor of the United States, which stretches from the Panhandle of Texas north into Minnesota, including some of the most wind-rich states in the country. Reasons include the quality of wind in the region, the possibilities of connecting into two different electric grid systems, and the scheduled transmission line build-out in the area.

Communities

City
 Floydada (county seat)

Town
 Lockney

Unincorporated communities
 Aiken
 Barwise
 Dougherty
 South Plains

Media
Floyd County is home to two general news organizations and two radio stations. In addition, Floydada is the corporate headquarters for Paramount Broadcasting Corp., which provides daily agricultural programming to All Ag, All Day affiliates (KFLP_(AM) in Floydada, TX, and KPUR_(AM) in Amarillo, TX) as well as All Ag Network affiliates from Fresno, CA to Utica, NY. For the first 23 years, the West Texas Friday Night Scoreboard Show was produced and syndicated from the downtown Floydada studios before moving to its current Lubbock studios in 2019.

Online
 Floyd County Record

Print
 Floyd County Hesperian-Beacon

Radio
 KFLP_(AM)
 KFLP-FM

Politics

Republican Drew Springer, Jr., a businessman from Muenster in Cooke County, has since January 2013 represented Floyd County in the Texas House of Representatives.

Education
School districts serving the county include:
 Floydada Independent School District
 Lockney Independent School District
 Motley County Independent School District
 Petersburg Independent School District
 Plainview Independent School District
 Turkey-Quitaque Independent School District

The county is in the service area of South Plains College.

See also

 Dry county
 Quitaque Creek
 National Register of Historic Places listings in Floyd County, Texas
 Recorded Texas Historic Landmarks in Floyd County
 Floydada Economic Development Corporation

References

External links
 
 Floyd County Profile from the Texas Association of Counties 

 
1890 establishments in Texas
Populated places established in 1890
Majority-minority counties in Texas